Neuerburg is a city in the district of Bitburg-Prüm, in Rhineland-Palatinate, Germany.

It is situated in the Eifel, near the border with Luxembourg, approx. 20 km north-west of Bitburg and 20 km north-east of Diekirch.

Neuerburg was formerly the seat of the Verbandsgemeinde ("collective municipality") of Neuerburg, and since 1 July 2014 has been the seat of the Verbandsgemeinde Südeifel.

References

Bitburg-Prüm